Steve Darmody (1890–1969) was a pioneer Australian who saw active service in the British army in WWI. He had been an Australian national representative rugby league player and toured with the Australian national team on their 1911–12 Kangaroo tour of Great Britain.

Career

A promising hurdler in his youth, Darmody joined the South Sydney Club in 1910 initially as a goal-kicking winger. He was chosen for the 1911–12 Kangaroo tour of Great Britain as versatile forward. He played in six minor matches on the tour, kicking nine goals.

Following the tour he stayed in England and along with Herb Gilbert and Jim Devereux he joined  Hull F.C. for whom he made 89 appearances between 1912 and 1914. Alongside Gilbert and Devereux, Darmody played as a forward, i.e. number 13, in Hull FC's 6–0 victory over Wakefield Trinity in the 1914 Challenge Cup Final during the 1913–14 season at Thrum Hall, Halifax, in front of a crowd of 19,000.

War service
At the outbreak of World War I, Darmody enlisted in the British Army. He saw service in Flanders as a despatch rider for the Service Corps. His foot was mangled in a machinery accident early in the war resulting in the loss of his foot. He had an artificial limb fitted and then re-enlisted.

The Hull club later played a testimonial match for Darmody. In 1921, when the airship R38 split in two over the River Humber and fell into the shallow estuary, Darmody searched through the rubble for survivors and was called to give evidence at the coronial inquest.

After the war he ran a motorcycle business in Hull and lived out his later life in Scotland.

Sources
 Whiticker, Alan & Hudson, Glen (2006) The Encyclopedia of Rugby League Players, Gavin Allen Publishing, Sydney

References

                   

1890 births
1969 deaths
Australasia rugby league team players
Australia national rugby league team players
Australian rugby league players
British Army personnel of World War I
Hull F.C. players
Royal Army Service Corps soldiers
Rugby league forwards
Rugby league wingers
South Sydney Rabbitohs players